Otto Georg Bogislaf von Glasenapp (30 September 1853 in Schivelbein – 3 March 1928 in Berlin) was vice-president of the Reichsbank.

Distinctions 
 Roter Adlerorden III. Klasse mit Schlaufe,
 Russischer Sankt Stanislaus Orden II. Klasse mit Stern,
 Ehrenbürger der Stadt Schivelbein

References

External links 
 https://portal.d-nb.de/opac.htm?query=Woe%3D116653124&method=simpleSearch

1853 births
1928 deaths
German bankers
People from Świdwin
People from the Province of Pomerania